Ambilstar Sunn (born 16 September 1988) is an Indian professional footballer who plays as a defender for Rangdajied United F.C. in the I-League.

Career

Rangdajied United
Sunn made his professional debut for Rangdajied in the I-League on 29 September 2013 against Bengaluru FC at the Bangalore Football Stadium. In his debut, Sunn played until the 87th minute before being replaced by Sandesh Gadkari. Rangdajied lost the match 3–0.

Career statistics

References

1988 births
Living people
Indian footballers
Rangdajied United F.C. players
I-League players
Footballers from Meghalaya
Association football defenders